Avery Point Light or Avery Point Lighthouse is a lighthouse in Groton, Connecticut, United States, on the Avery Point Campus of the University of Connecticut. Although construction was completed in March 1943, the lighthouse was not lit until May 1944 due to concerns of possible enemy invasion. Its original light consisted of eight 200-watt bulbs that were later replaced by a flashing green light in 1960. It was deactivated on June 25, 1967, when the United States Coast Guard Training Station moved to Governors Island. It is officially listed as the last lighthouse built in the state; the only other claimant is the replica Mystic Seaport Light.

The lighthouse deteriorated until it was declared a hazard by the University of Connecticut in 1997. A restoration effort was launched in 1999 through the American Lighthouse Foundation (ALF) and in 2000 by a new local chapter, the Avery Point Lighthouse Society. The restoration of the lighthouse began in 2001 and was completed in 2006, requiring a replica lantern and extensive structural repairs and replacement of the crumbling of the blocks. Two bills for $150,000 and $100,000 were appropriated and used to complete the restoration. The relighting and re-dedication of the lighthouse was held on October 15, 2006. The lighthouse was listed on the National Register of Historic Places in 2002.

Construction 

The land upon which Avery Point Light was constructed was owned by Morton F. Plant's estate; his Branford House is located several hundred feet away. Twenty four years after Plant's death the estate was sold to the state of Connecticut before being transferred to the U.S. Coast Guard. The Coast Guard's deed required the construction and maintenance of beacon lights or other navigational aids as part of the Coast Guard's new training facility. The Avery Point Light was named for Captain James Avery of New London, Connecticut.

The Avery Point Light was designed by Alfred Hopkins and Associates to be a 41-foot (12 m) octagonal tower. Construction of the tower was completed in March 1943; it is built of brown concrete blocks and topped with an octagonal wooden lantern. During the restoration effort, it was discovered that six different types of concrete blocks were used in the construction. The tower has a total of five windows, with two facing south and one for the north, east and west. The lantern gallery deck is constructed of concrete and lined with thirty two Italian marble balusters, originally imported from Italy around 1900. The interior has an iron ladder, originally wooden, that leads up to the watchroom level. The lighthouse design and masonry tower have Colonial Revival elements. It is the last lighthouse built in the state of Connecticut as an official navigational aid.

Service 
The Avery Point Light was not lighted until May 2, 1944, due to concerns about possible enemy invasions by sea.  D'Entremont notes that the first light, consisting of eight 200-watt bulbs, were an unusual array that created a fixed white light source. Though it never had a formal keeper, the lighthouse was tended by personnel or students from the United States Coast Guard Training Station. In 1960, the light was changed to flashing green and the candlepower rating doubled from 100 to 200. The light was deactivated on June 25, 1967, when the training facility moved from Avery Point to Governors Island.

Restoration 

The Avery Point Light was listed by the university as being in "dangerously poor condition" by July 1997 and declared it a safety hazard. In December 2007, Lighthouse Digest included a brief article with the title "Avery Point added to Doomsday List" after rumors of it being torn down were reported. The article included two images that show the blocked off lighthouse with its crumbling bricks and a sign reading "Keep Out Hazardous Area". In 1999, fund-raising began to save and restore the lighthouse through the American Lighthouse Foundation (ALF) and in 2000 through the Avery Point Lighthouse Society (APLS), a chapter of the ALF.

In 2000, the APLS website estimated $25,000 for the initial engineering study and $150,000-200,000 to complete the restoration. In 2001, Connecticut State Senator Catherine Cook introduced a bill for $150,000 in bonds to fund the restoration of the Avery Point Light; it was later approved. An article in the New London Day also noted an engineering study valued at $40,000 was being conducted for no cost by James Nordon's engineering firm of Gibble, Norden and Champion.

On December 1, 2001, the first part of the restoration began with the removal of the lantern.  Due to the deterioration of the lantern, the decision was made to make a replica of the original lantern.  From 2003 through 2004, the West Mystic Wooden Boat Building Company donated the materials and labor to construct the replica.  The company's owner, Steve Jones, has close ties to the Avery Point Light; he is a former lighthouse keeper for the Harbor of Refuge Light in Lewes, Delaware, and is also a University of Connecticut professor.

The concrete blocks used in the construction were of poor construction due to the high sand content that crumbled with the expanding and contraction of the mortar. The decision was made to replace the outer face of the concrete blocks and strengthen the remaining original blocks with cement and steel reinforcements. A total of 3,000 blocks were needed to complete the restoration and had to be produced using special molds. The restoration work on the tower began in September 2003. Though increased costs of the restoration resulted in another need of funding to complete the project. In 2003, federal funding for another $100,000 came from the National Park Services "Save America’s Treasures Act" and it was endorsed by Senators Christopher Dodd and Joseph Lieberman. Delays in the appropriation of funding delayed the second phase of the structural restoration until June 2005; and the work was conducted from July through early November. The relighting and re-dedication of the lighthouse was held on October 15, 2006.

Importance 
The lighthouse has been claimed to be a memorial tower in various sources, including the 1994 America's Atlantic Coast Lighthouses: A Traveler's Guide which states "the tower was built as a memorial tower and as a symbolic representation of the USCG lighthouse keeping responsibilities." D'Entremont notes that the misunderstanding stems from an article from 1955 in U.S. Coast Guard Magazine and acknowledges that it has come to serve as a memorial. The lighthouse was added to the National Register of Historic Places in 2002.

See also 

 List of lighthouses in the United States
 List of lighthouses in Connecticut
 National Register of Historic Places listings in New London County, Connecticut

References

External links 

 Avery Point Lighthouse Society

Lighthouses completed in 1943
Long Island Sound
Lighthouses on the National Register of Historic Places in Connecticut
Lighthouses in New London County, Connecticut
Buildings and structures in Groton, Connecticut
Octagonal buildings in the United States
University of Connecticut
National Register of Historic Places in New London County, Connecticut